Sofia Sigizmundovna Dzerzhinskaya (born Muszkat; ; ; 4 December 1882 – 27 February 1968) was a leading Polish Social Democrat and later Communist politician. During WWII, she was director of the Polish language Tadeusz Kościuszko radio station, broadcasting the communist message into occupied Poland.

From September 1918 through February 1919, Sofia was a member of the Soviet diplomatic mission in Bern. From 1920, she lived in the Soviet Union, in Moscow where she worked as a teacher. In 1922, Sofia worked in the School of Rosa Luxemburg in Moscow, later, 1923–24 at the Communist University of the National Minorities of the West. After that, she worked in the Polish Bureau of the Communist Party of the Soviet Union. From 1939 to 1943, Sofia worked at the Executive Committee of Comintern. In 1969, her memoirs "Lata wielkich bojów: wspomnienia" were published in Poland by Książka i Wiedza publishing house. She died in Moscow in 1968 and was buried at Novodevichy Cemetery.

Personal life
She was born in Warsaw, Poland, to a Jewish family. She married Felix Dzerzhinsky on 10 November 1910 in Kraków at the St. Nicholas Church. On 23 June 1911, in Pawiak prison, she gave birth to their only son and child Janek (Jan).

See also
 Provisional Polish Revolutionary Committee

References

Sources

Robert Blobaum: Feliks Dzierzynsky and the SDKPiL: A study of the origins of Polish Communism (1984). 

1882 births
1968 deaths
19th-century Polish Jews
20th-century Polish politicians
People from Warsaw Governorate
Politicians from Warsaw
Chopin University of Music alumni
Communist Party of the Soviet Union members
Recipients of the Order of Lenin
Recipients of the Order of the Banner of Work
Recipients of the Order of the Red Banner of Labour
Social Democracy of the Kingdom of Poland and Lithuania politicians
Bolsheviks
Jewish socialists
Polish communists
Polish emigrants to the Soviet Union
Polish revolutionaries
Soviet women diplomats

Burials at Novodevichy Cemetery